Hakeem Effects (born Hakeem Onilogbo Ajibola), is a Nollywood make-up artist; with specialties include special effects, eyebrows and eyelashes. He is the founder and Chief Executive Officer of "Tricks International"; a special effects and prosthetics company serving a range of productions in the Nollywood film industry. He is known for working on several major films such as King of Boys and Omo Ghetto: The Saga, as well as several music videos. 

In 2017, he won the "Best Make-up" Africa Magic Viewers Choice Award for Oloibiri and Africa’s Best Makeup Artist at the 2016 and 2017 Africa Movie Academy Awards in both 2016 and 2017.

Filmography

Film and television

Awards and nominations

References

External links 

Nigerian make-up artists
Living people
Year of birth missing (living people)